Stade Olympique de l'Emyrne is the football section of a Malagasy sports club based in Antananarivo, Madagascar. They won the THB Champions League in 2001 and were runners-up in the Coupe de Madagascar in 2003.

SOE's 2002 results were forfeited after the team conceded 149 own goals in a match against AS Adema in protest of a refereeing decision. It was the biggest win in a national top division match.

Achievements
THB Champions League: 1
2001

References

Football clubs in Madagascar
Antananarivo